Acta Koreana is a biannual peer-reviewed academic journal covering Korean studies published in English by Academia Koreana (Keimyung University, Daegu, SK). It was established in 1998 as an annual publication; since 2002 it has been published biannually.

Abstracting and indexing 
The journal is abstracted and indexed in the Arts & Humanities Citation Index, Current Contents/Arts & Humanities, Scopus, CSA Sociological Abstracts, Bibliography of Asian Studies, Korea Citation Index, and SocINDEX.

References

External links 
 

Korean studies journals
Cultural journals
English-language journals
Biannual journals
Publications established in 1998
Keimyung University
1998 establishments in South Korea